The 312th Airlift Squadron is a United States Air Force Reserve squadron, assigned to the 349th Operations Group, stationed at Travis Air Force Base, California.  It is an associate unit of the active duty 22d Airlift Squadron, 60th Air Mobility Wing. It operates C-5M Galaxy aircraft supporting the United States Air Force global reach mission worldwide. The mission is to provide services and support which promote quality of life and project global power through combat-proven airlift and airdrop.

History

World War II

The unit was constituted as 312 Troop Carrier Squadron on 23 October 1943. Activated on 1 November 1943 and assigned to 349 Troop Carrier Group at Sedalia Army Air Field, MO. Moving to Alliance AAFld, NE, 20 January 1944; Pope Field, NC, 11 March 1944; Baer Field, IN, 7–15 March 1945; Barkston, England, 30 March 1945; Roye/Amy Airfield, France, 18 April-13 July 1945 providing aerial transportation in the European Theater of Operations during World War II. Moved to Bergstrom Field, TX, 17 September 1945 – 7 September 1946. Principally operating C-53 and C-47, 1943-1944, and C-46, 1944-1946. Inactivated on 7 September 1946. Redesignated as 312 Troop Carrier Squadron, Medium on 10 May 1949. Moving to Hamilton AFB, CA, 27 June 1949.

Air Force reserve and Korean mobilization
Inactivated on 2 Apr 1951. Redesignated as 312 Fighter-Bomber Squadron on 26 May 1952, F-51 Mustang fighters. Activated in the Reserve on 13 Jun 1952.

Return to the reserves
Resumed its reserve operations as a fighter-bomber squadron from 1952–1957. Redesignated as 312 Troop Carrier Squadron, Medium on 1 September 1957, with C-119 transport aircraft.

The 312th was called to active duty during the Cuban Missile Crisis in 1962 and from 1968–1969, with C-124. Moved to Travis AFB, CA, 25 July 1969 and redesignated as: 312 Military Airlift Squadron (Associate) on 25 July 1969.
Flying C-141 Starlifters between 1969-1973 & C-5 Galaxys from 1973. Redesignated 312 Airlift Squadron (Associate) on 1 February 1992.

The squadron airlifted United States troops between the continental United States and Southeast Asia and flew other strategic airlift missions as needed across the Pacific Ocean, including channel flights, contingency and humanitarian relief operations, and joint training exercises.  Flew missions in support of anti-terrorism operations after 11 September 2001 terrorist attack on the U. S.

On September 15, 2014 the wing was presented with the 2013 Outstanding Reserve Aircrew Award, the President's Award for displayed outstanding ability and professionalism by overcoming multiple system emergencies while flying Air Mobility Command missions between Rota Spain and Kandahar Air Base, Afghanistan. The 312th has provided airlift support for Operation Enduring Freedom, the U.S. government for the Global War on Terrorism.

Lineage

 Constituted as the 312th Troop Carrier Squadron on 23 October 1943
 Activated on 1 November 1943
 Inactivated on 7 September 1946
 Redesignated 312th Troop Carrier Squadron, Medium on 10 May 1949
 Activated in the reserve on 27 June 1949
 Ordered to active service on 1 April 1951
 Inactivated on 2 April 1951
 Redesignated 312th Fighter-Bomber Squadron on 26 May 1952
 Activated in the reserve on 13 June 1952

 Redesignated 312th Troop Carrier Squadron, Medium on 1 September 1957
 Ordered to active service on 28 October 1962
 Relieved from active duty on 28 November 1962
 Redesignated 312th Military Airlift Squadron on 1 July 1966
 Ordered to active service on 26 January 1968
 Relieved from active duty on 2 June 1969
 Redesignated 312th Military Airlift Squadron (Associate) on 25 July 1969
 Redesignated 312th Airlift Squadron (Associate) on 1 February 1992
 Redesignated 312th Airlift Squadron on 1 October 1994

Assignments
 349th Troop Carrier Group, 1 November 1943 – 7 September 1946
 349th Troop Carrier Group, 27 June 1949 – 2 April 1951
 349th Fighter-Bomber Group (later 349th Troop Carrier Group), 13 June 1952
 349th Troop Carrier Wing, 14 April 1959
 938th Troop Carrier Group (later 938 Military Airlift Group), 11 February 1963
 349th Military Airlift Wing (later 349 Airlift Wing), 1 July 1973
 349th Operations Group, 1 August 1992 – present

Stations

 Sedalia Army Air Field, Missouri, 1 November 1943
 Alliance Army Air Field, Nebraska, 20 January 1944
 Pope Field, North Carolina, 11 March 1944
 Baer Field, Indiana, 7–15 March 1945
 RAF Barkston Heath (AAF-483), England, 30 March 1945

 Roye-Amy Airfield (A-73), France, 18 April – 13 July 1945
 Bergstrom Field, Texas, 17 September 1945 – 7 September 1946
 Hamilton Air Force Base, California, 27 June 1949 – 2 April 1951
 Hamilton Air Force Base, California, 13 June 1952
 Travis Air Force Base, California, 25 July 1969 – present

Aircraft

 Douglas C-53 Skytrooper (1943–1944)
 Douglas C-47 Skytrain (1943–1944, 1955–1956)
 Curtiss C-46 Commando (1944–1946, 1949–1951, 1952–1955, 1957–1958)
 Beechcraft T-7 Navigator (1949–1951)
 Beechcraft T-11 Kansan (1949–1951)
 North American T-6 Texan (1952–1954)
 North American P-51 Mustang (1952–1954)
 North American T-28 Trojan (1953–1956)
 Lockheed T-33 T-Bird (1953–1957)
 Lockheed F-80 Shooting Star (1953–1957)
 Beechcraft C-45 Expeditor (1955–1956)
 Republic F-84 Thunderjet (1956–1957)
 Fairchild C-119 Flying Boxcar (1958–1966)
 Douglas C-124 Globemaster II (1966–1969)
 Lockheed C-141 Starlifter (1969–1973)
 Lockheed C-5 Galaxy (1973–present)

Decorations
Decorations. Air Force Outstanding Unit Award with Combat "V" Device: 1 August 2002 – 31 July 2002. Air Force Outstanding Unit Awards: 23 December 1964 – 22 January 1965; 26 January 1968 – 1 June 1969; 1 July 1974 – 30 June 1975; 1 July 1975 – 30 June 1977; 1 July 1992 – 30 June 1994; 1 Jul 1994 – 15 Aug 1995; 1 July 1996 – 30 June 1998; 1 August 2000 – 31 July 2002; 16 August 2003 – 17 August 2004; 18 August 2004 – 17 August 2005; 18 August 2005 – 17 August 2006; 18 August 2006 – 17 August 2007; 18 August 2007 – 17 August 2008; 18 August 2008 – 17 August 2009. Republic of Vietnam Gallantry Cross with Palm: 1 April 1966 – 28 January 1973.

References

 Notes

Bibliography

External links

Military units and formations in California
312